The Red Countess may refer to:

 Hermynia Zur Mühlen (1883–1951), Austrian writer and translator
 Katinka Andrássy (1892–1985), Hungarian noblewoman and wife of Mihály Károlyi
 The Red Countess, a 1985 Hungarian film, based on Katinka Andrássy
 Marion Dönhoff (1909–2002), German journalist active in the anti-Nazi resistance
 Constance Markievicz (1868–1927), Irish politician, suffragette and socialist